Torrini may refer to

 Torrini (jeweller)
 Rudolph Edward Torrini, an American artist
 Emilíana Torrini, an Icelandic singer songwriter
 Elisa Torrini, an Italian model

See also 
 Turini (disambiguation)